"The Way You Love Me" is the lead single from American singer Karyn White's 1988 self-titled debut studio album.  Written and produced by Kenneth "Babyface" Edmonds, Antonio "L.A." Reid and Daryl Simmons, this song was the first of White's four top-ten hits on the Billboard Hot 100. "The Way You Love Me" was certified Gold by the Recording Industry Association of America (RIAA) on March 9, 1989.

Music video
The accompanying music video for "The Way You Love Me" was shot in Los Angeles in July 1988.

Track listing and formats
7-inch vinyl single (USA, Germany)
 The Way You Love Me (Edit) – 3:45
 Love on the Line – 4:05

12-inch vinyl single (UK)
 The Way You Love Me (12" Club Mix) – 6:40
 The Way You Love Me (12" Hype Remix) – 7:27
 Love on the Line – 4:05

12-inch vinyl single (UK)
Mini CD (Germany)
 The Way You Love Me (Paul Simpson Remix) – 6:50
 The Way You Love Me (Simp-House Dub) – 5:08
 The Way You Love Me (Paul Simpson 7" Remix) – 4:34

12-inch vinyl single (USA, Germany)
 "The Way You Love Me" (12" Hype Remix) – 7:27
 "The Way You Love Me" (Love Dub #1) – 5:25
 "The Way You Love Me" (Love Dub #2) – 3:48
 "The Way You Love Me" (12" Hype Remix Edit) – 3:41
 "The Way You Love Me" (12" Club Mix) – 6:40
 "The Way You Love Me" (Instrumental) – 5:20

Chart performance
The single peaked at number seven on the US Billboard Hot 100, number one on the Dance/Electronic Singles Sales chart, and at number five on the Dance Club Songs chart. It also reached number 42 on the UK Singles Chart.

Charts

Weekly charts

Year-end charts

Certifications

References

1988 songs
1988 singles
Karyn White songs
New jack swing songs
Songs written by Babyface (musician)
Songs written by L.A. Reid
Songs written by Daryl Simmons
Song recordings produced by L.A. Reid
Song recordings produced by Babyface (musician)
Song recordings produced by Daryl Simmons
Warner Records singles